Denay may refer to:

, a valley in Eureka County, Nevada, United States
Denay Limestone, a geological formation in the Denay Valley
Denay Jock Chagor, South Sudanese politician
Jessica Denay, American writer